La Jérusalem délivrée is a 1712 French opera in a prologue and five acts by Duke Philippe II, Duke of Orléans, the future Regent of France. The libretto by Hilaire-Bernard Requeleyne was based on La Gerusalemme liberata by Tasso. The opera was performed in the Galerie des cerfs of the Château de Fontainebleau, by the musique du roi.

References

Operas